Cataclysta seriopunctalis is a Crambidae species of moth in the genus Cataclysta. It was described by George Hampson in 1897 and is known from New Guinea, Amboina and Fergusson Island.

References

Moths described in 1897
Acentropinae